Yanci Urbina (1964 – 29 May 2022) was a Salvadoran politician who served as a member of the Legislative Assembly of El Salvador between 2018 and 2021 for the Farabundo Martí National Liberation Front (FMLN).

References

Date of birth missing
1960s births
2022 deaths
21st-century Salvadoran politicians
Members of the Legislative Assembly of El Salvador
Farabundo Martí National Liberation Front politicians